Aabech is a Danish surname. Notable people with the surname include:

 Hans Aabech (1948–2018), Danish footballer
 Kim Aabech (born 1983), Danish footballer, son of Hans

See also
 Aabach (disambiguation)

Danish-language surnames